In mathematics, Carleman linearization (or Carleman embedding) is a technique to transform a finite-dimensional nonlinear dynamical system into an infinite-dimensional linear system. It was introduced by the Swedish mathematician Torsten Carleman in 1923. Carleman linearization is related to composition operator and has been widely used in the study of dynamical systems. It also been used in many applied fields, such as in control theory and in quantum computing.

Procedure 
Consider the following autonomous nonlinear system:

 

where  denotes the system state vector.

At the desired nominal point, the nonlinear functions in the above system can be approximated by Taylor expansion

 

Without loss of generality, we assume that  is at the origin.

Applying Taylor approximation to the system, we obtain

 

Consequently, the following linear system for higher orders of the original states are obtained:

 

where , and similarly .

Employing Kronecker product operator, the approximated system is presented in the following form

 

See also 

 Carleman matrix
 Composition operator

References

External links 

 A lecture about Carleman linearization by Igor Mezić

Dynamical systems
Functions and mappings
Functional analysis